Glenore Jean Pointing  (1913–1984), known professionally as Glen Alyn, was an Australian actress who appeared in British films from the 1930s until 1957. Originally a dancer in West End revue, she made her film debut in The Outsider (1931) under her real name, Glenore Pointing. A Warner Brothers contract and numerous films followed, as well as occasional stage work.

Selected filmography
 Head of the Family (1933)
 Mayfair Girl (1933)
 Head of the Family (1933)
 Don't Get Me Wrong (1937)
 Mayfair Melody (1937)
 Ship's Concert (1937)
 Simply Terrific (1938)
 Thank Evans (1938)
 Sweet Devil (1938)
 It's in the Blood (1938)
 The Ware Case (1938)
 Old Mother Riley Joins Up (1940)
 A Window in London (1940)
 Law and Disorder (1940)
 Another Shore (1948)
 Maytime in Mayfair (1949)
 There's Always a Thursday (1957)

References

Bibliography
 Goble, Alan. The Complete Index to Literary Sources in Film. Walter de Gruyter, 1999.

External links

1913 births
1984 deaths
Australian stage actresses
Australian film actresses
British stage actresses
British film actresses
Australian expatriates in England
Actresses from Sydney